Stu Riddle (born 23 May 1976) is a former footballer who played as a striker. He is currently the head coach at D'Youville University and was formerly the head coach of the men's soccer team at Western Michigan University, University of Buffalo, and Northern Kentucky University.

Playing career
Riddle went to Wellington's Scots College. Riddle played for Wellington United in the New Zealand Superclub competition.

At the age of 19, Riddle was the member of Bobby Clark's 1996 New Zealand Olympic Team, where he made four appearances including one as a substitute, in a 1–0 victory over then Oceania rivals Australia.

After brief stints with several clubs including Chelmsford City in the UK, Riddle turned to the US college system and spent two years with the Myrtle Beach-based Coastal Carolina University before being signed by Kiwi football icon Wynton Rufer for the Kingz debut season in the National Soccer League in 1999.

Although he signed a two-year contract, Riddle struggled to regularly feature in the Kingz side and only managed nine appearances with a return of two goals, both of which came away from home against Adelaide United and Brisbane Strikers.

Better form would be found in the lower United States leagues with Riddle being a mainstay of the Laurie Calloway-coached Des Moines Menace side that would achieve an undefeated season in the 2002 USL Premier Development League competition.

Riddle turned to the UK again in the hope of being signed by a Football League side but again struggled with the higher level of play and had short spells at Oxford City and Greenock Morton before being reunited with former Kingz teammates Marcus Stergiopoulos and Levent Osman at the Melbourne-based Altona Magic in the Victorian Premier League.

He fell out of favour with the management of the Macedonian flavoured club and returned to the United States.

Management career
In 2006, he became a coach in the United Soccer Leagues when he accepted a player-coaching job with Kalamazoo Kingdom in the USL Premier Development League, United States elite development league.

In 2008, he served as the head coach for the Kalamazoo Outrage in the USL Premier Development League, United States elite development league team in the franchises inaugural year. On 13 July 2008 the Kalamazoo Outrage qualified for the 2008 USL Premier Development League playoffs in their inaugural year.

Riddle guided his side to second place in the Central Conferences Midwest Division narrowly finishing behind the Chicago Fire Premier in the regular season standings. His side would get their revenge eliminating the Chicago Fire Premier from the 2008 playoffs by virtue of a 2–0 victory at Toyota Park on 22 July.

The teams run would continue under Riddle and they defeated perennial USL Premier Development League powerhouse the Michigan Bucks on 26 July to advance to the national quarter finals where the Thunder Bay Chill would end the Outrage's season.

Riddle became the sixth head coach of Western Michigan University when he was named the men's soccer coach on 30 January 2009. With this announcement he became the first New Zealander to be a head men's soccer coach at the National Collegiate Athletic Association (NCAA) Division I level.

Riddle coached at the University of Buffalo for four seasons where he compiled a record of 28-32-13. In his final two seasons as head coach, he guided the Bulls to the MAC championship, falling short both times. 

He was hired as the 4th coach in Northern Kentucky University men's soccer program history.  He led the Norse to an overall record of 37-36-5 during his 5 seasons at the helm of the program. This included a Horizon League Regular Season Championship and being named Horizon League Coach of the Year. Coach Riddle resigned as head coach of the Norse in December of 2021. 

In January 2023, Riddle was appointed head coach of the NCAA Division II D'Youville Saints.

Personal
Riddle earned his master's degree in public service administration from the University of Evansville in 2007 while serving as an assistant coach for the Purple Aces. He is recently divorced and has two small daughters.

References

1976 births
Living people
Association football forwards
Buffalo Bulls men's soccer coaches
Coastal Carolina Chanticleers men's soccer players
Des Moines Menace players
Expatriate soccer players in the United States
Football Kingz F.C. players
Greenock Morton F.C. players
Kalamazoo Kingdom players
Kalamazoo Outrage players
Nelson Suburbs players
New Zealand association footballers
New Zealand expatriate association footballers
New Zealand expatriate sportspeople in the United States
New Zealand people of English descent
Northern Kentucky Norse men's soccer coaches
Oxford City F.C. players
People educated at Scots College, Wellington
Footballers from Luton
USL League Two players
Wellington United players
West Michigan Edge players
Western Michigan Broncos men's soccer coaches
New Zealand association football coaches
Expatriate soccer managers in the United States
Chelmsford City F.C. players
New Zealand expatriate sportspeople in England
Expatriate footballers in England
Miramar Rangers AFC players
Western Suburbs FC (New Zealand) players
YoungHeart Manawatu players
Altona Magic SC players
Coastal Carolina Chanticleers men's soccer coaches
Southern Indiana Screaming Eagles men's soccer coaches
Evansville Purple Aces men's soccer coaches
USL League Two coaches
Fairfield Stags men's soccer coaches
Association football player-managers
D'Youville Saints
University of Evansville alumni